Tentha is a village in Thoubal District in Manipur, India.

About Tentha
It is one of the large village in Thobal district. It is surrounded by Wabgai in south-west, Ikop lake in north, Wangjing in east, and Khangabok in north-east.

Demographics
 India census, Tentha had a population of 6704. Males and females population are 3340 and 3364, respectively.

Localities in Tentha
Name of localities (leikai) in Tentha are:
 Tentha Thambal Chingya 
 Tentha Khunjao Makha Leikai 
 Tentha Mayai Leikai
 Tentha Mathak Leikai
 Tentha Tuwabal
 Tentha Khongbal 
 Tentha Heibung
 Tentha Khunou
 Tentha Marongband

Economy
Majority of the people in this village practice agriculture. Tentha is famous for the production of fish in Thoubal district.

Connectivity
There are 4 important inter-village roads which connect Tentha with other parts of the district, they are:
 Wangjing-Tentha road 
 Tentha-Marongband road
 Khangabok/Wabagai-Tentha road and 
 Kakching-Tentha road

Politics
Wangjing Tentha assembly constituency (Assembly Constituency No. 34) is part of Outer Manipur (Lok Sabha constituency).

See also
 Moirangthem Nara

References

Thoubal
Villages in Thoubal district